Eshqabad (also Romanized as ʿ‘Eshqābād, ‘Ishaqābād, and ‘Ishqābād) is a village in Fariman Rural District, in the Central District of Fariman County, Razavi Khorasan Province, Iran. At the 2006 census, its population was 1,038, in 244 families.

References 

Populated places in Fariman County